Axiocerses collinsi is a butterfly in the family Lycaenidae. It is found in the coastal forests of Kenya. The habitat consists of coastal forests.

Adults have been recorded in May, July, December and April.

References

Butterflies described in 1996
Axiocerses
Endemic insects of Kenya
Butterflies of Africa